Barry Schwartz (born August 15, 1946) is an American psychologist.  Schwartz is the Dorwin Cartwright Professor of Social Theory and Social Action at Swarthmore College and since 2016 has been visiting professor at the University of California, Berkeley. His work focuses on the intersection of psychology and economics. He frequently publishes editorials in The New York Times, applying his research in psychology to current events.
Schwartz's research addresses morality, decision-making and the inter-relationships between behavioral science and society. 
His books criticize certain philosophical roots of Western societies and expose underlying myths common in both lay and academic psychological theories. In particular, he is a critic of the "rational economic man" model in both psychology and economics. Schwartz studied under David Richmond Williams for his PhD at the University of Pennsylvania where he was a predoctoral fellow with National Science Foundation.

Education
 BA New York University, 1968.
 PhD University of Pennsylvania, 1971.

Publications

Articles
A select number of his works are available online.

Books
 Why We Work, Simon & Schuster/TED, 2015.
 The Paradox of Choice: Why More Is Less, Ecco, 2004.
  Psychology of Learning and Behavior, with Edward Wasserman and Steven Robbins
 The Costs of Living: How Market Freedom Erodes the Best Things in Life, Xlibris Corporation, 2001. 
 Learning and Memory, with Daniel Reisberg
 The Battle for Human Nature: Science, Morality and Modern Life
 Behaviorism, Science, and Human Nature, with Hugh Lacey, W. W. Norton & Company, 1983.
 Practical Wisdom, with Kenneth Sharpe, Riverhead, 2010,

References

External links

 Speech at Pop!tech 2004
 Barry Schwartz: Curriculum Vitae
 
 "The paradox of choice" (TEDGlobal 2005)
 "Our loss of wisdom" (TED2009)
 "Using our practical wisdom" (TEDSalon NY2011 2010)
 
 Interview: Barry Schwartz discusses the role of justice in college admissions

American sociologists
21st-century American psychologists
New York University alumni
University of Pennsylvania alumni
Swarthmore College faculty
1946 births
Living people
20th-century American psychologists